President Street Synagogue was the first synagogue in Transvaal, South Africa.

The first Jewish service in Johannesburg was held in the store of a Mr. Weinstein on the corner of Mark and Harrison Streets. The first High Holy Days services were held in 1887 in the old Rand Club of Johannesburg on Commissioner Street by the rabbi Joel Rabinowitz.

Shortly, afterwards, from 1888–89, the President Street Synagogue was built. It was one of the first brick buildings in the young city and was designed by Arthur Reid and Robert McCowat and contracted to a Mr. Rowe. E. Mendelsohn laid the cornerstone on September 24, 1889, but the date was later held to be November 1888. When it was completed, Johannesburg had a Jewish population of around 100. The synagogue looked south onto President Street and stretched between Kruis and Von Brandis Streets. It was sold in March 1926.

References 

Buildings and structures in Johannesburg
Synagogues in South Africa